Harry Michael Overy (January 21, 1951 – September 22, 2021) was an American professional baseball player who pitched in five games during the 1976 season for the California Angels of Major League Baseball. Overy graduated from Olivet Nazarene University.

References

External links

1951 births
2021 deaths
Major League Baseball pitchers
California Angels players
Baseball players from Illinois
Olivet Nazarene Tigers baseball players
People from Clinton, Illinois